The Merauke blue-tongued skink (Tiliqua gigas evanescens), also known as the faded blue-tongued skink, or giant blue-tongued skink, is a subspecies of Tiliqua that is native to Indonesia and Papua New Guinea. The Merauke blue-tongued skink is the longest of all the Tiliqua species; often reaching nearly 26-30 inches (66–76 cm) in total length. The species is often exported for the exotic pet trade, and is steadily growing in popularity within both herpetoculture and zoological exhibits globally.

Natural habitat
The Merauke blue-tongued skink hails from the tropical environment of Indonesia and Papua New Guinea.

In captivity
Most specimens of the Merauke blue tongue skink present in captivity are of wild-caught origin. Captive breeding efforts have risen with the growing interest of blue tongue skinks within herpetoculture; however, the species still remains widely imported.

Blue tongue skinks are often displayed within zoological facilities. It is a popular species among herpetoculturists.

References

gigas
Skinks of New Guinea

https://www.tiliqua-time.com A care and reference website for all Indonesian blue tongue skink sub-species.